Ox-Tales refers to four anthologies of short stories written by 38 of the UK's best-known authors. All donated their stories to Oxfam. The books and stories are loosely based on the four elements: Earth, Fire, Air and Water.

The Ox-Tales books were published in partnership with Green Profile to raise revenue for Oxfam projects tackling poverty around the world. Oxfam receives a percentage of the cover price of each book sold (£3.50 per book if bought directly from an Oxfam shop or Oxfam's website and 50p if the books are purchased through other retailers).

Themes
The themes of the collections are intended to represent four aspects of Oxfam's work:

 Earth — land rights and farming
 Air — combating climate change
 Fire — campaigning for arms control
 Water — safe water and sanitation

Each book contains a poem by Vikram Seth and an afterword written by Oxfam, detailing their work in that area.

Authors
38 British and Irish based authors contributed to this project.

Earth:
Rose Tremain, Jonathan Coe, Marti Leimbach, Kate Atkinson, Ian Rankin, Marina Lewycka, Hanif Kureishi, Jonathan Buckley, Nicholas Shakespeare, Vikram Seth.

Air:
Alexander McCall Smith, Helen Simpson, DBC Pierre, AL Kennedy, Kamila Shamsie, Beryl Bainbridge, Louise Welsh, Diran Adebayo, Helen Fielding, Vikram Seth.

Water:
Esther Freud, David Park, Hari Kunzru, Zoë Heller, Michel Faber, William Boyd, Giles Foden, Joanna Trollope, Michael Morpurgo, Vikram Seth.
 
Fire:
Mark Haddon, Geoff Dyer, Victoria Hislop, Sebastian Faulks,
John Le Carré, Xiaolu Guo, William Sutcliffe, Ali Smith, Lionel Shriver, Jeanette Winterson, Vikram Seth.

Publication details
Ox-Tales were published by Green Profile (a section of Profile Books) on 2 July 2009. They were originally published to mark the start of Oxfam's first annual book festival - "Bookfest" (4–18 July 2009).

Reception
In Autumn 2009, the National Association for the Teaching of English (NATE) recommended Ox-Tales to its readers as "enjoyable, thought-provoking reading for you and also for older students — well worth a place in the secondary school stock cupboard for KS4 of KS5."

NATE reprinted Marina Lewycka's story "The Importance of Having Warm Feet" from the Ox-Tales: Earth collection in the October 2009 edition of their magazine, Classroom.

References

External links
 William Skidelsky, "Charity aids the art of storytelling", The Guardian, 14 June 2009.
 The Times Online review
 Boyd Tonkin, "Boyd Tonkin: A feast of stories for a planet in want", The Independent, 3 July 2009.
 Katy Guest, "Ox-Tales: Earth, Air, Fire and Water, various authors" (review), Independent on Sunday, 5 July 2009.
 Sam Leith, "Telling tales" (review), The Spectator, 1 July 2009.

Oxfam
Fiction anthologies
2009 anthologies
2009 in the United Kingdom
British anthologies